Helizabad or Halizabad may refer to:
 Helizabad, Dehgolan
 Halizabad, Marivan